The 1999 Montreal Expos season was the 31st season in franchise history.

Offseason
Future Heisman Trophy winner Ricky Williams was taken by the Montreal Expos in the 1998 Rule 5 draft. The Expos sold his rights to the Texas Rangers.

Spring training
In 1999, the Expos held spring training at Roger Dean Stadium in Jupiter, Florida, a facility they shared with the St. Louis Cardinals. It was their second season there.

Regular season

Opening Day starters
 Shane Andrews
 Miguel Batista
 Orlando Cabrera
 Brad Fullmer
 Vladimir Guerrero
 Wilton Guerrero
 Manny Martínez
 Rondell White
 Chris Widger

Season standings

Record vs. opponents

Transactions
May 17, 1999: Mel Rojas was signed as a free agent with the Montreal Expos.
June 2, 1999: Brandon Phillips was drafted by the Montreal Expos in the 2nd round of the 1999 amateur draft. Player signed June 21, 1999.
July 3, 1999: Mel Rojas was released by the Montreal Expos.

Roster

Player stats

Batting

Starters by position 
Note: Pos = Position; G = Games played; AB = At bats; H = Hits; Avg. = Batting average; HR = Home runs; RBI = Runs batted in

Other batters 
Note: G = Games played; AB = At bats; H = Hits; Avg. = Batting average; HR = Home runs; RBI = Runs batted in

Pitching

Starting pitchers 
Note: G = Games pitched; IP = Innings pitched; W = Wins; L = Losses; ERA = Earned run average; SO = Strikeouts

Other pitchers 
Note: G = Games pitched; IP = Innings pitched; W = Wins; L = Losses; ERA = Earned run average; SO = Strikeouts

Relief pitchers 
Note: G = Games pitched; W = Wins; L = Losses; SV = Saves; ERA = Earned run average; SO = Strikeouts

Award winners

1999 Major League Baseball All-Star Game
 Vladimir Guerrero, outfield, reserve

Farm system

LEAGUE CHAMPIONS: Harrisburg

References

External links
 1999 Montreal Expos at Baseball Reference
 1999 Montreal Expos at Baseball Almanac
 Boxscore of Tony Gwynn's 3000th Hit
 David Cone Perfect Game Box Score
 

Montreal Expos seasons
Montreal Expos season
1990s in Montreal
1999 in Quebec